Dolphin Smalltalk, or "Dolphin" for short, is an implementation of the Smalltalk programming language for Microsoft Windows.

The Dolphin 7 version release coincided with the project going open-source using the MIT License.

Dolphin uses an integrated development environment. The toolset of this Smalltalk dialect include an integrated refactoring browser, a package browser and a WYSIWYG "view composer". Dolphin deviates from the convention of the Smalltalk MVC framework with the choice of a Model–view–presenter framework.

Features
Integration of the Refactoring Browser tools from Refactory Inc.
Package-based browsing environment as an alternative to a conventional Smalltalk class hierarchy browser.
A "tabbed" container for managing Dolphin browsers and tools and associating them together with a particular idea or workflow. The goal is to save screen space and clutter and to help developers focus on their train of thought.
Source code management very similar to the ENVY source code manager that was available for some other commercial Smalltalk dialects.

References

External links
 Object Arts website( site appears to be no longer reachable).
 Dolphin Smalltalk on Github

Smalltalk programming language family
Software using the MIT license